Ringwould is a village and electoral ward near Deal in Kent, England. 
The coastal confederation of Cinque Ports during its mediaeval period consisted of a confederation of 42 towns and villages in all. This included Ringwould, as a 'limb' of Dover.

Ripple Windmill, which is being restored, lies within the parish.

The village also has one Grade II listed building, in its district. as well as the Grade I listed church of St Nicholas.

Frederick Ernest Cleary (1905-1984) CBE, who was originally a Chartered Surveyor from Crouch End, London. Later, he formed a very successful company 'Haslemere Estates', who refurbished many of the City of London's fine old buildings during the 1970s and '80s. 
In 1975 Fred purchased and refurbished an old rectory building ('Ripple Down House') in Ringwould. This became an environmental education centre for children. It later merged with the 'Bay Trust' in St Margeret's Bay who manage and operate the Pines Garden.

References

External links

Villages in Kent
Dover District